Salter's Mill is a historic gristmill built  and located at 33 Imlaystown Road in the Imlaystown section of Upper Freehold Township in Monmouth County, New Jersey. It was added to the National Register of Historic Places on September 29, 1980, for its significance in agriculture, architecture, and exploration/settlement. The mill is next to a  mill pond, which was also used in the ice business. In 1985, it was also listed as a contributing property of the Imlaystown Historic District.

History
A 17th century mill was built here by Richard Salter. It was badly damaged by a fire in 1897 and the current mill was built soon afterwards. The two and one-half story frame building has a horizontal turbine wheel. The mill was later owned by the Imlay family, namesake of the community. The last owner was the Golden family, who closed mill operations in 1962.

Richard Salter's daughter, Hannah, married Mordecai Lincoln, who were great-great grandparents of Abraham Lincoln.

See also
 National Register of Historic Places listings in Monmouth County, New Jersey

References

External links
 

Upper Freehold Township, New Jersey		
National Register of Historic Places in Monmouth County, New Jersey
Grinding mills on the National Register of Historic Places in New Jersey
New Jersey Register of Historic Places
Historic district contributing properties in New Jersey
Individually listed contributing properties to historic districts on the National Register in New Jersey
Buildings and structures completed in 1897
1897 establishments in New Jersey